Florian Silbereisen (born 4 August 1981) is a German Schlager singer and show host.

Since February 2004, Silbereisen has been a television presenter of the show Feste der Volksmusik on German broadcaster ARD. He was in a relationship with singer Helene Fischer.

References

External links

MDR: Das Adventsfest der 100.000 Lichter (in German)
Stern:Ein Glühwein zuviel, Florian Silbereisen randaliert auf Weihnachtsmarkt (in German)

German folk singers
German television presenters
Living people
1981 births
21st-century German male singers
ARD (broadcaster) people